Brahms/Handel is a ballet made by New York City Ballet ballet master Jerome Robbins in collaboration with Twyla Tharp to Brahms' Variations and Fugue on a Theme by Handel, Op. 24 (1861), orchestrated by Edmund Rubbra. The premiere took place Thursday, June 7, 1984 at the New York State Theater, Lincoln Center, with costumes by Oscar de la Renta and lighting by Jennifer Tipton.

Casts

Original 
   
Merrill Ashley
Maria Calegari
 
Ib Andersen
Bart Cook

NYCB revivals

2008 Spring — Jerome Robbins celebration 

  
first cast
 
Ashley Bouder
Wendy Whelan
 
Philip Neal
Andrew Veyette

  
second cast

Abi Stafford
Sara Mearns

Gonzalo Garcia
Jared Angle

Footnotes

References 

  
Playbill, NYCB, Sunday, June 22, 2008

Articles 

  
NY Times, Anna Kisselgoff, November 13, 1983
 
Sunday NY Times, Anna Kisselgoff, April 22, 1984

Reviews 

  
NY Times, Anna Kisselgoff, June 9, 1984
 
NY Times, Alastair Macaulay, June 24, 2008

Ballets by Jerome Robbins
Ballets by Twyla Tharp
Ballets to the music of Johannes Brahms
Ballets to the music of George Frideric Handel
1984 ballet premieres
Ballets designed by Jennifer Tipton
Ballets designed by Oscar de la Renta